Munlochy railway station served the village of Munlochy, Ross and Cromarty, Scotland, from 1894 to 1951 on the Fortrose Branch.

History
The station was opened on 1 February 1894 by the Highland Railway. To the east was a goods yard, which had a goods shed, and by the level crossing was a railway cottage. The station closed on 1 October 1951.

References

Disused railway stations in Ross and Cromarty
Former Highland Railway stations
Railway stations in Great Britain opened in 1894
Railway stations in Great Britain closed in 1951
1894 establishments in Scotland
1951 disestablishments in Scotland